Navarcles is a municipality in the province of Barcelona and autonomous community of Catalonia, Spain.

Demography 
According to Spanish census data, this is the population of Navarcles in recent years.

References

External links
 Government data pages 

Municipalities in Bages